King Size is the twenty-fourth studio album by B. B. King, released in 1977.

Track listing
"Don't You Lie to Me" (Hudson Whittaker)
"I Wonder Why" (William Preston, George Johnson)
"I Just Wanna Make Love to You" (Willie Dixon)
"Your Lovin' Turned Me On" (Riley King, Esmond Edwards)
"Slow and Easy" (Earl Randle)
"Got My Mojo Working" (Preston Foster)
"Walking in the Sun" (Jeff Barry)
"Mother Fuyer" (Traditional; arranged and adapted by Riley King)
"The Same Love That Made Me Laugh" (Bill Withers)
"It's Just a Matter of Time" (Brook Benton, Belford Hendricks, Clyde Otis)

Personnel
B.B. King – guitar, vocals
Lee Ritenour, Milton Hopkins, Charles Julian Fearing– guitar
Joe Turner, Scott Edwards Jr. – bass guitar
Sonny Burke – piano, synthesizer
James Toney, Ronnie Barron – Hammond organ
Ed Greene, John "Jabo" Starks – drums
Earl Nash, Eddie "Bongo" Brown – percussion, congas
Jimmy Forrest – tenor saxophone
Fred Jackson Jr. – tenor saxophone, flute
Ernie Watts – alto saxophone
Jerome Richardson – baritone saxophone
Garnett Brown – trombone
Al Aarons, Bobby Bryant, Roy Poper – trumpet
Nils Oliver, Ron Cooper – cello
Paul Polivnick, Rollice Dale – viola
Charles Veal, Jr., Haim Shtrum, Harris Goldman, Janice Gower, Kathleen Lenski, Bill Henderson – violin
Charles Veal, Jr. – concertmaster
Johnny Pate – horn and string conductor and arranger
Garnett Brown – horn and string conductor and arranger on "Slow and Easy"

References

1977 albums
B.B. King albums
Albums arranged by Johnny Pate
Albums produced by Esmond Edwards
ABC Records albums